Garnock Way was a short-lived Scottish soap opera, produced by Scottish Television for the ITV network, running from 1976 to 1979. It was replaced by Take the High Road which also featured actors Eileen McCallum, Bill Henderson, Paul Kermack, Michael Elder and John Stahl.

History
Garnock Way was set in a mining community in a town halfway between Glasgow and Edinburgh. It was deemed to be too gritty for network consumption, which resulted in only certain stations broadcasting the series.

In the summer of 1979 Garnock Way was axed and replaced by Take the High Road, which was a bigger budget affair and more in keeping with the 'tartan' perception of Scotland as it was deliberately set in a more beautiful part of Scotland.

In 2010 it was announced that Garnock Way would be one of the STV archive programmes soon to be available on YouTube. The STV Player channel on the video-sharing website launched on 20 August 2010. However, just four episodes of the series are known to exist, and these are available on the STV Player.

Transmissions
Only a few ITV stations broadcast the series:

 Southern Television from June 1976 until September 1977
 HTV throughout 1977
 Border Television From late 1976 until Summer 1979
 UTV From March 1977 until Summer 1979

Characters
Jean Ross – Eileen McCallum
Alex Ross – Gerard Slevin
Tod Baxter – Bill Henderson
Mary Baxter – Terry Cavers
Louise Baxter – Harriet Buchan
Jock Nesbit – Paul Kermack
Willie Mclean – William Armour
Hughie Ross – Alan Watters
Sandra Cully – Dorothy Paul
Cully – Jackie Farrell
Cliff Hewitt – George Howell
Effie Murdoch – Ginni Barlow
Harry Murdoch – Bill McCabe
Carla the café owner – Ida Schuster
Det Sgt Golspie – Michael Elder
PC Scoular – John Stahl
Georgina Munro – Jan Wilson

The outside scenes depicting the characters' houses were filmed in Charles Street, Torbothie, an area of Shotts in North Lanarkshire. The still picture at the start of the programme, showing the street with the monument, is of the Mercat Cross in Airth.

References

External links
 (STV Player)
 The Glasgow Herald – 30 Mar 1976 p. 7 – https://news.google.com/newspapers?nid=GGgVawPscysC

1970s British television soap operas
1970s Scottish television series
1976 Scottish television series debuts
1979 Scottish television series endings
English-language television shows
ITV soap operas
Lost television shows
Scottish television soap operas
Take the High Road
Television shows produced by Scottish Television